Moravian chicken pie  is a savory meat pie that originated in the colonial town of Salem, North Carolina. It is a traditional double crusted pie made with flaky shortcrust pastry filled with only chunks of poached chicken meat and a thick broth-based sauce. Unlike chicken pot pies, vegetables are never included in the filling. The pie is served in slices with hot chicken gravy on top, and extra gravy on the side. Mashed potatoes are a common accompaniment.

History
The Moravian immigrants who founded Salem in 1766 were familiar with the preparation of meat pies, which are a staple of the cuisine of Central Europe, their ancestral home. In keeping with the simple, frugal Moravian lifestyle, the preparation of chicken pie required only five readily available ingredients (chicken, broth, flour, butter, salt) and a short baking time on an open hearth.

Since colonial times, the recipe for Moravian chicken pie has changed little, and its culinary fame has spread far beyond Winston-Salem so that it has become an iconic North Carolina dish. Fresh and frozen pies are available in restaurants, stores, and specialty food shops throughout the Piedmont region. Homemade Moravian chicken pies are a perennial staple of local church fundraisers, so much so that pastors are known to estimate the cost of various church projects by the number of chicken pies that must be sold to fund the project.

See also
 List of pies, tarts and flans
 List of foods of the Southern United States
 Moravians
 Moravian church
 Old Salem

References

External links
 Moravian Chicken Pie from The Complete Cook's Country TV Show; The Mom Chef
Moravian Chicken Pie; Our State Magazine

Savoury pies
American pies
American chicken dishes
Moravian settlement in North Carolina
North Carolina cuisine